The 1986 Hungarian Grand Prix was a Formula One motor race held at the newly constructed Hungaroring on 10 August 1986. It was the eleventh race of the 1986 Formula One World Championship.

It was the first Hungarian Grand Prix since 1936, and the first-ever Formula One race to be held behind the Iron Curtain. The race was attended by 200,000 spectators from across the Eastern Bloc; this stood as a record for a Formula One race  for nearly a decade, until 210,000 attended the 1995 Australian Grand Prix in Adelaide.

The race was notable for the battle between fierce Brazilian rivals Nelson Piquet in his Williams-Honda and Ayrton Senna in his Lotus-Renault. Piquet, after an unsuccessful attempt on the previous lap, managed to pass the Lotus driver around the outside as they went into the first corner, on opposite lock. He also came in for some criticism following the race, especially in the British press, as he had allegedly neglected to tell his team-mate Nigel Mansell about the benefits of a new differential which provided better grip on the slippery, dusty surface (however, it later came to light that Mansell had in fact tried the new diff in practice but had preferred the older one).

The race was won by Piquet, ahead of Senna. Mansell finished 3rd and a lap down in his Williams with Stefan Johansson (Ferrari), Johnny Dumfries (Lotus) and Martin Brundle (Tyrrell-Renault) rounding out the points finishers. Defending World Champion Alain Prost qualified 3rd in his McLaren-TAG, an accident on lap 23 saw him as a non-finisher in what was his 100th Grand Prix start.

Classification

Qualifying

Race

Championship standings after the race

Drivers' Championship standings

Constructors' Championship standings

References

Hungarian Grand Prix
Hungarian Grand Prix
Grand Prix
August 1986 sports events in Europe